The Central African Red Cross Society, abbreviated CRCA, was founded in 1966. It has its head in Bangui, Central African Republic.

External links
Central African Red Cross Society Profile

Red Cross and Red Crescent national societies
1966 establishments in the Central African Republic
Organizations established in 1966
Medical and health organisations based in the Central African Republic